= Villa Igno, Pistoia =

The Villa Igno' or Villa d'Igno is a Renaissance style, rural aristocratic palace located outside of the town of Pistoia, region of Tuscany, Italy.

The villa was built as a rural retreat for the bishops of Pistoia. The name Igno recalls the sacred fire of Vesta. Construction of the villa was begun by Niccolo di Giannozzo Pandolfini (1440-1518), bishop of Pistoia since 1474 and created Cardinal in 1517. Construction proceeded under Bishop Lorenzo Pucci and then by Lorenzo's nephew Bishop Antonio Pucci, who completed it between 1529 and 1540.

The villa had a number of prominent visitors including Duke Alessandro de'Medici in 1531. Pope Paul III was hosted here in 1541 by Bishop Roberto Pucci. During this time, the plague was afflicting the cities of Italy. In addition, the town of Pistoia was not kindly to the German soldiers guarding the Pope in his travels.
